Best Shots is a Platinum-certified greatest hits album released by the American rock singer Pat Benatar in 1987 in Europe and in an updated version in 1989 in North America. It peaked at No. 67 on the U.S. Billboard 200 album chart, two years after the album peaked at No. 6 in the UK.

Track listings

European version

U.S. version

Charts

Weekly charts

Year-end charts

Certifications

References

1987 greatest hits albums
Pat Benatar albums
Albums produced by Keith Olsen
Albums produced by Mike Chapman
Chrysalis Records compilation albums